Nagymizdó is a village in Vas county, Hungary. Is a municipality of 126 inhabitants (2008 data). It is located in the province of Vas.

References

Populated places in Vas County